The Marion Courthouse Square Historic District is a historic district in Marion, Alabama.  It is centered on the Perry County Courthouse and includes examples of Greek Revival, Gothic Revival, and Tudor Revival architecture. The boundaries are roughly along Green, Washington, Jefferson, Jackson, Franklin, Clements, Centreville and Monroe Streets. It was added to the National Register of Historic Places on February 16, 1996.

References

National Register of Historic Places in Perry County, Alabama
Historic districts in Perry County, Alabama
Courthouses on the National Register of Historic Places in Alabama
County courthouses in Alabama
Greek Revival architecture in Alabama
Gothic Revival architecture in Alabama
Tudor Revival architecture in Alabama
Government buildings completed in 1836
Historic districts on the National Register of Historic Places in Alabama
1836 establishments in Alabama
Marion, Alabama